"Stay Away" is a song first recorded by Elvis Presley as part of the soundtrack for his 1968 motion picture Stay Away, Joe.

History

Writing 
The song was written by Sid Tepper and Roy C. Bennett and published by Gladys Music, Inc. It is based on the traditional song "Greensleeves", which Presley requested  to rework for him. The first version the songwriters made (in 1967) was titled "Evergreen", but Elvis never recorded it.

Recording 
Elvis Presley recorded "Stay Away" during a non-movie recording session on Monday January 15, 1968.

Release 
The song was released on a single as a flip side to "U.S. Male" in 1968. "Stay Away" peaked at number 67 on the Billboard Hot 100, while "U.S. Male" peaked at number 28.

Charts

References

External links 
 Elvis Presley with The Jordanaires – U.S. Male / Stay Away at Discogs

1968 songs
1968 singles
Elvis Presley songs
RCA Records singles
Songs written by Sid Tepper
Songs written by Roy C. Bennett
Songs written for films